Özker is both a masculine Turkish given name and a surname. Notable people with the name include:

Given name:
 Özker Özgür, Turkish-Cypriot politician
 Ozker Yasin, Turkish poet

Surname:
 Eren Ozker, American puppeteer

Turkish-language surnames
Turkish masculine given names